Gulabdas Broker was a Gujarati language writer from India. He is primarily known for his short stories and one-act plays in Gujarati literature.

Biography 
Broker was born at Porbandar on 20 September 1909. He completed his education in Gujarati and English literature from Bombay University in 1930. He briefly worked at the Bombay Stock Exchange. Later he started his writing in 1932 when he was jailed during the Satyagraha movement. His first short story collection was Ane Biji Vato ("And Other Talks").

Broker served as the president of Gujarati Sahitya Parishad from 1973 to 1974. He died on 10 June 2006 at Pune, Maharashtra.

Works 
He edited Akhandand, a Gujarati monthly. He wrote large number of short stories, plays, travelogues and autobiography too. Several of them are translated into Hindi, Spanish, German and English. He also edited Ekanki, a periodical devoted to one-act plays.

Awards 
Broker was awarded the Padma Shri, the fourth highest civilian award in India in 1992. He was also awarded Ranjitram Suvarna Chandrak, the highest literary award in Gujarati language, in 1998. He also received Kumar Chandrak in 1968.

The Government of Gujarat awarded him the Narsinh Mehta Award.

See also
 List of Gujarati-language writers

References

External links
 
 

1909 births
2006 deaths
Writers from Gujarat
Gujarati-language writers
People from Porbandar district
Recipients of the Padma Shri in literature & education
20th-century Indian essayists
20th-century Indian short story writers
20th-century Indian dramatists and playwrights
Recipients of the Ranjitram Suvarna Chandrak